KBS 3 may refer to:

 KBS3 (KBS 3TV), Korean TV station
 KBS Radio 3 (KBS Happy FM), Korean radio station
 KBS 3FM, former name of the Korean radio station KBS Cool FM

See also
 KBS (disambiguation)